The following is the filmography of Hong Kong actor Liu Kai-chi.

Television

Film

References 

Hong Kong filmographies
Male actor filmographies